Tomáš Micka (born 7 June 1983) is a Czech former professional ice hockey forward who last played for HC Slavia Praha of the Czech second-tier league. He was selected by the Edmonton Oilers in the 8th round (245th overall) of the 2002 NHL Entry Draft.

Micka previously played for HC Havířov, Columbus Cottonmouths, Toledo Storm, HK Dukla Trenčín, HC Slovan Ústečtí Lvi and HC České Budějovice.  In 2019 he became a referee in the Czech Extraliga.

Career statistics

Regular season and playoffs

International

References

External links 

1983 births
Czech ice hockey forwards
Edmonton Oilers draft picks
Columbus Cottonmouths (ECHL) players
Greenville Grrrowl players
Toledo Storm players
Victoria Salmon Kings players
Motor České Budějovice players
HC Slavia Praha players
HC Havířov players
HC Slovan Ústečtí Lvi players
BK Havlíčkův Brod players
HC Karlovy Vary players
HK 95 Panthers Považská Bystrica players
HK Dukla Trenčín players
Living people
Sportspeople from Jihlava
Czech expatriate ice hockey players in Canada
Czech expatriate ice hockey players in the United States
Czech expatriate ice hockey players in Slovakia